Ruthenian (руска(ѧ) мова; also see other names) is an exonymic linguonym for a closely-related group of East Slavic linguistic varieties, particularly those spoken from the 15th to 18th centuries in the Grand Duchy of Lithuania and in East Slavic regions of the Polish–Lithuanian Commonwealth. Regional distribution of those varieties, both in their literary and vernacular forms, corresponded approximately to the territories of the modern states of Belarus and Ukraine. By the end of the 18th century, they gradually diverged into regional variants, which subsequently developed into the modern Belarusian, Ukrainian, and Rusyn languages. 

In the Austrian and Austro-Hungarian empires, the same term was employed continuously (up to 1918) as an official exonym for the entire East Slavic linguistic body within its borders.

Several linguistic issues are debated among linguists: various questions related to classification of literary and vernacular varieties of this language; issues related to meanings and proper uses of various endonymic (native) and exonymic (foreign) glottonyms (names of languages and linguistic varieties); questions on its relation to modern East Slavic languages, and its relation to Old East Slavic (the colloquial language used in Kievan Rus' in the 10th through 13th centuries).

Nomenclature

[[File:Biblia Ruska.jpg|right|thumb|upright|Ruthenian Bible printed in 1517]]

Since the term Ruthenian language was exonymic (foreign, both in origin and nature), its use was very complex, both in historical and modern scholarly terminology. 

Names in contemporary use
Contemporary names, that were used for this language from the 15th to 18th centuries, can be divided into two basic linguistic categories, the first being endonyms (native names, used by native speakers as self-designations for their language), and the second exonyms (names in foreign languages).

Common endonyms:
 Ruska(ja) mova, written in various ways, as: рѹска(ѧ) or руска(ѧ) мова, and also as: рѹс(ь)кй or рус(ь)кй ѧзыкъ. (Old Belarusian / Old Ukrainian: руски езыкъ)
 Prosta(ja) mova (meaning: the simple speech, or the simple talk), also written in various ways, as: прост(ѧ) мова or простй ѧзыкъ (Old Belarusian / Old Ukrainian: простый руский (язык) or простая молва, проста мова) – publisher Hryhorii Khodkevych (16th century). Those terms for simple vernacular speech were designating its diglossic opposition to literary Church Slavonic.
 In contemporary Russia, it was sometimes also referred to (in territorial terms) as Litovsky ( / Lithuanian). Also by Zizaniy (end of the 16th century), Pamva Berynda (1653).

Common exonyms:
 in Latin: lingua ruthenica, or lingua ruthena, which is rendered in English as: Ruthenian or Ruthene language.
 in German: ruthenische Sprache, derived from the Latin exonym for this language.
 in Hungarian: Rutén nyelv, also derived from the Latin exonym.

Names in modern use 

Modern names of this language and its varieties, that are used by scholars (mainly linguists), can also be divided in two basic categories, the first including those that are derived from endonymic (native) names, and the second encompassing those that are derived from exonymic (foreign) names.

Names derived from endonymic terms:

 One "s" terms: Rus’ian, Rusian, Rusky or Ruski, employed explicitly with only one letter "s" in order to distinguish this name from terms that are designating modern Russian.
 West Russian language or dialect (западнорусское наречие) – terms used mainly by supporters of the concept of the Proto-Russian phase, especially since the end of the 19th century. Employed by authors such as Karskiy and Shakhmatov.
 Old Belarusian language – term used by various Belarusian and some Russian scholars, and also by Kryzhanich. The denotation Belarusian (language) when referring both to the post-19th-century language and to the older language had been used in works of the 19th-century Russian researchers Fyodor Buslayev, Ogonovskiy, Zhitetskiy, Sobolevskiy, Nedeshev, Vladimirov and Belarusian researchers, such as Karskiy.
 Old Ukrainian language – term used by various Ukrainian and some other scholars.
 Lithuanian-Russian language – regionally oriented designation, used by some 19th-century Russian researchers such as: Keppen, archbishop Filaret, Sakharov, Karatayev.
 Lithuanian-Slavic language – another regionally oriented designation, used by 19th-century Russian researcher Baranovskiy.
 Chancery Slavonic, or Chancery Slavic – a term used for the written form, based on Old Church Slavonic, but influenced by various local dialects and used in the chancery of Grand Duchy of Lithuania.

Names derived from exonymic terms:

 Ruthenian or Ruthene language – modern scholarly terms, derived from older Latin exonyms (lingua ruthena), commonly used by scholars who are writing in English and other western languages, and also by various Lithuanian and Polish scholars. 
 Ruthenian literary language, or Literary Ruthenian language – terms used by the same groups of scholars in order to designate more precisely the literary variety of this language.
 Ruthenian chancery language, or Chancery Ruthenian language – terms used by the same groups of scholars in order to designate more precisely the chancery variety of this language, used in official and legal documents of the Grand Dutchy of Lithuania.
 Ruthenian common language, or Common Ruthenian language – terms used by the same groups of scholars in order to designate more precisely the vernacular variety of this language. 
 North Ruthenian dialect or language – a term used by some scholars as designation for northern varieties, that gave rise to modern Belarusian language, that is also designated as White Ruthenian. 
 South Ruthenian dialect or language – a term used by some scholars as designation for southern varieties, that gave rise to modern Ukrainian language, that is also designated as Red Ruthenian.

Terminological dichotomy, embodied in parallel uses of various endoymic and exonymic terms, resulted in a vast variety of ambiguous, overlapping or even contrary meanings, that were applied to particular terms by different scholars. That complex situation is addressed by most English and other western scholars by preferring the exonymic Ruthenian designations.

Periodization

Daniel Bunčić suggested a periodization of the literary language into:

 Early Ruthenian, dating from the separation of Lithuanian and Muscovite chancery languages (15th century) to the early 16th century 
 High Ruthenian, from Francysk Skaryna (fl. 1517–25), to Ivan Uzhevych (Hramatyka slovenskaia, 1643, 1645) 
 Late Ruthenian, from 1648 to the establishment of the Ukrainian and Belarusian standard languages at the end of the 18th century

George Shevelov gives a chronology for Ukrainian based on the character of contemporary written sources, ultimately reflecting socio-historical developments: Proto-Ukrainian, up to the mid-11th century, Old Ukrainian, to the 14th c., Early Middle Ukrainian, to the mid-16th c., Middle Ukrainian, to the early 18th c., Late Middle Ukrainian, rest of the 18th c., and Modern Ukrainian.

 See also 
 Linguonym
 Slavic studies
 Galicia (Eastern Europe)
 Ruthenian Uniate Church

References

Literature

 
  
  
 
  
 
 
 
 
 
 
 
 
 
 
 Pivtorak, Hryhorij. “Do pytannja pro ukrajins’ko-bilorus’ku vzajemodiju donacional’noho periodu (dosjahnennja, zavdannja i perspektyvy doslidžen’)”. In: Movoznavstvo'' 1978.3 (69), p. 31-40.

External links

 "Hrodna town books language problems in Early Modern Times" by Jury Hardziejeŭ
 

 
East Slavic languages
Medieval languages
Ukrainian diaspora